Aiden Levi Marsh (born 5 May 2003) is an English professional footballer who plays as a forward for Scunthorpe United on loan from Barnsley.

Club career
Marsh began playing football with the youth academy of Barnsley before moving to Sheffield United at the age of 8 where he played as a left-back. He returned to Barnsley's academy in 2014. He signed his first professional contract with the club on 11 September 2020. He made his professional debut with Barnsley coming on in the 78th minute for Matty Wolfe in a 0-1 EFL Championship loss to Bournemouth on 29 January 2022. On 12 September 2022, Marsh joined National League club Scunthorpe United on loan until January.

International career
Marsh was called up to a training camp for the England U17s in November 2019.

References

External links
 
 Barnsley FC U23 Profile

2003 births
Living people
Footballers from Barnsley
English footballers
Association football forwards
Barnsley F.C. players
English Football League players